Gadarpur is a post independence city and a municipal board in Udham Singh Nagar district in the state of Uttarakhand, India. This city was formed with the arrival of the refugees from Pakistan at the time of partition of 1947. The refugees settled here and started living here. The refugees are Punjabi which makes up a majority in the city.

Demographics
 India census, Gadarpur had a population of 19,301. Males constitute 52% of the population and females 48%. Gadarpur has an average literacy rate of 64%, higher than the national average of 59.5%: male literacy is 69%, and female literacy is 59%. In Gadarpur, 16% of the population is under 6 years of age and its literacy rate is 100%.

History 

During the partition of 1947 the Terai forest was cut down for settlement of the refugees during the time of Partition of India. This place developed into a township by time.

Accessibility
The nearest Airport is 24 km away at Pantnagar. Gadarpur is connected by road with all the major cities of the state and region. Gadarpur is well connected with big cities like Haridwar, Dehradun, Kashipur, Rudrapur, Haldwani, Delhi, Moradabad and Bareilly. It is also well connected with famous hill station Nainital. It is located on national highway NH-74. Delhi is about 234 km away and Haridwar is about 175 km away from Gadarpur. The city is also near to Gularbhoj dam.

Petrol pumps in Gadarpur
Hazari Lal & Company  (B P C)
Hind Oil Distributor (I O C)
Narang Filling Station (I O C)
Krishna Fuel Station (I O C)
Reliance Fuel Station 
(R I L)

Schools In Gadarpur 
 P.S Model Inter College 
 S.S.Public School 
 Red Rose Convent School
 Monad Public School
 Lions Public School
 G. I. C
 Red Rose Public School
 St. Mary's School
 Saraswati Vidya Mandir Inter College 
 Saraswati Shishu Mandir

References

Cities and towns in Udham Singh Nagar district